Melissa Madden Gray, stage name Meow Meow, is an Australian-born actress, dancer and cabaret performer who tours internationally. Gray has been particularly active in the UK where she appeared in La Clique at the Roundhouse and created the role of the Maîtresse in the West End musical adaptation of The Umbrellas of Cherbourg at the Gielgud Theatre. In 2010 Meow Meow was awarded the Edinburgh Festival Fringe Prize. In January 2011 she premiered "Meow Meow in Concert" for three nights at the Apollo Theatre on London's West End. She was named Best Cabaret Performer at the 2012 Helpmann Awards for her show, Little Match Girl. She debuted "An Audience with Meow Meow" at the Berkeley Repertory Theatre in California as part of their Fall 2014 season.

Training
As an undergraduate, Gray studied at the University of Melbourne where she was a resident student at Trinity College. She took the degrees of Bachelor Laws and Bachelor of Arts in Fine Arts and German (with honours).

Gray is also a graduate of the Western Australian Academy of Performing Arts, and has been a soloist with the Young Dancers Theatre (Victoria).

Style 
Gray performs a style of cabaret that has been called "kamikaze cabaret". She may stagger onto the stage, appear later than scheduled, experience wardrobe malfunctions, shout unexpected things, and interact with audience members. However, "... this is a polished presentation of the spectacle of failure – a ruse that underlines the necessary collaboration between performer and audience, and creates a shabby frame within which Meow Meow's exquisite voice can shine all the brighter", as written in a 2018 Guardian article.

Theatre

Reviews 
 Barry Humphries' Weimar Cabaret, Cadogan Hall, London, reviewed by Tim Ashley The Guardian July–August 2016
 Apocalypse Meow, Southbank Centre, London, reviewed by Claudio Giambrone, South Bank London December 2014
 The Umbrellas of Cherbourg, Gielgud Theatre, London, reviewed by Paul Taylor, The Independent, 24 March 2011
 The Umbrellas of Cherbourg, Gielgud Theatre, London, reviewed by Michael Billington, The Guardian, 23 March 2011
 Soho Theatre, London, reviewed by Brian Logan, The Guardian, 29 March 2010

References

External links 

 
 
 

21st-century Australian actresses
Australian female dancers
Australian cabaret performers
Living people
People educated at Trinity College (University of Melbourne)
Western Australian Academy of Performing Arts alumni
Helpmann Award winners
Year of birth missing (living people)
Australian women singers